Brycea is a genus of moths in the subfamily Arctiinae.

Species
 Brycea disjuncta
 Brycea itatiayae
 Brycea triplaga

References

External links
Natural History Museum Lepidoptera generic names catalog

Lithosiini
Moth genera